The 2015 Junior League World Series took place from August 16–23 in Taylor, Michigan, United States. Taichung, Taiwan defeated Stephens City, Virginia in the championship game. In addition to being the second straight championship for Chung Shan LL; Taiwan became the first County/State to win three straight JLWS championships.

Teams

Results

United States Pool

International Pool

Elimination Round

References

Junior League World Series
Junior League World Series